Loredan is a Venetian surname. The House of Loredan is an aristocratic Venetian family that included various doges of the Republic of Venice, and the surname is almost exclusively associated with the family. The surname most likely originated from the toponym Loreo (a town in the Veneto), which itself originated from its Latin name Lauretum, meaning laurel. Another theory of the origin of the surname, though most likely legendary, is that it comes from the Latin epithet Laureati, given to ancestors of the Loredan family due to their historical glory in ancient Rome and the many victories they achieved in battles. The surname is spelled Loredano or Loredan in Italian, Lauredano or Lauredanus in Latin, and Lorentano in Greek, though it is also historically found as Lordas and Lordano. The feminine name Loredana, common in Italy and Romania, was likely inspired by the surname. 

Notable people with the surname include: 

 Alvise Loredan (1393 – 1466), Venetian admiral and military commander
 Andrea Loredan (1455 – 1499), Venetian admiral
 Andrea Loredan (d. 1513), Venetian nobleman and art collector
 Antonio Loredan (1420 – 1482), Venetian governor and military commander
 Antonio Loredan (1446 – 1514), Venetian politician and ambassador
 Caterina Loredan, Dogaressa of Venice (1521 – 1523)
Fosco Loredan (d. 1598), Venetian nobleman
 Francesco Loredan (1656 – 1715), Venetian ambassador
 Francesco Loredan (1685 – 1762), 116th Doge of Venice (1752 – 1762)
 Giacomo Loredan (1396 – 1471), Venetian admiral and military commander
 Giorgio Loredan (d. 1475), Venetian admiral, military commander and politician
 Giovanni Loredan (d. 1411), Venetian nobleman and Bishop of Capo d'Istria (1390 – 1411)
 Giovanni Loredan, Lord of Antiparos
 Giovanni Francesco Loredan (1607 – 1661), Venetian writer and politician
 Leonardo Loredan (1436 – 1521), 75th Doge of Venice (1501 – 1521)
 Marco Loredan, Venetian nobleman
 Marco Loredan (1489 – 1557), Venetian nobleman and politician
 Marco Loredan (d. 1577), Venetian nobleman, Bishop of Nona (1554 – 1577) and Archbishop of Zara (1573 – 1577)
 Paolina Loredan, Dogaressa of Venice (1655 – 1656)
Pietro Loredan (1372 – 1438), Venetian admiral and military commander
Pietro Loredan (1481 – 1570), 84th Doge of Venice (1567 – 1570)
Teodoro Loredan Balbi (1745 – 1831), Bishop of Novigrad (1795 – 1831)

Places

 Barchessa Loredan
 Ca' Loredan
Ca' Loredan Vendramin Calergi
Palazzo Giustinian Loredan
Palazzo Loredan a San Cancian
Palazzo Loredan Cini
Palazzo Loredan dell'Ambasciatore
Palazzo Loredan Gheltoff
Palazzo Loredan in Campo Santo Stefano
Palazzo Priuli Ruzzini Loredan
Villa Loredan at Carbonera
Villa Loredan at Stra
Villa Razzolini Loredan
Villa Spineda Loredan
Villa Nani Loredan
Tomb of Doge Leonardo Loredan

Art 
Bust of Andrea Loredan, by Antonio Rizzo, 15th century, Museo Correr, Venice

Panegyricus Leonardo Lauredano, by Sigismundus Burgus, 1503, Walters Art Museum, Baltimore

Portrait of Doge Leonardo Loredan, by Giovanni Bellini, 1501, National Gallery, London

Portrait of Doge Leonardo Loredan, by Vittore Carpaccio, 1501, Museo Correr, Venice

Portrait of Doge Pietro Loredan, by Jacopo Tintoretto, 1567, Kimbell Art Museum, Fort Worth

Portrait of the Loredan family, by Giovanni Bellini, 1507, Gemäldegalerie, Berlin

Other 
MV Loredan, auxiliary cruiser of the Italian Royal Navy

Italian-language surnames